Sanjiang is a town in and the seat of Liannan Yao Autonomous County, in northwestern Guangdong province, China, and is served by China National Highway 323. , it has one residential community and 10 villages under its administration.

See also
List of township-level divisions of Guangdong

References

Township-level divisions of Guangdong